The 1991 World Men's Curling Championship (branded as 1991 Canada Safeway World Men's Curling Championship for sponsorship reasons) took place from March 23 to 31 at the Winnipeg Arena in Winnipeg, Manitoba, Canada.

Teams

Round-robin standings

Round-robin results

Draw 1

Draw 2

Draw 3

Draw 4

Draw 5

Draw 6

Draw 7

Draw 8

Draw 9

Playoffs

Semifinals

Final

References
 
 Video: 

World Men's Curling Championship
World Mens Curling Championship, 1991
Curling competitions in Winnipeg
Canada Safeway World Mens Curling Championship
International curling competitions hosted by Canada
March 1991 sports events in Canada
1990s in Winnipeg